swm (the Solbourne window manager)  is an X Window System window manager developed by Tom LaStrange at Solbourne Computer in 1990. The most important innovation of swm was the introduction of the virtual desktop. It also introduced a primitive form of session management (restoring programs in use at the time of shutdown) to X.

References
 Thomas E. LaStrange (1990) swm: An X window manager shell. USENIX Summer.
 http://users.polytech.unice.fr/~buffa/cours/X11_Motif/motif-faq/part4/faq-doc-1.html

Free X window managers